Mount Burstall is a summit in Alberta, Canada.

Mount Burstall was named for H. E. Burstall, a British army officer who commanded Canadian troops during World War I.

References

Two-thousanders of Alberta
Alberta's Rockies